Alassane N'Dour (born 12 December 1981) is a Senegalese former professional footballer who played as a defensive midfielder.

Career
N'Dour played for AS Saint-Étienne and Troyes AC, both in France. In 2003–04 he spent time on loan at West Bromwich Albion.

He also played for the Senegal national team and was a participant at the 2002 FIFA World Cup.

In February 2008 N'Dour joined Walsall on loan until the end of the 2007–08 season. His performance in the 2–1 home win against Tranmere Rovers on 5 April 2008 saw him named in the League One Team of the Week.

From 15 May 2009 he signed in Greece, to Doxa Drama, a historic team of Greek football, promoting to the second division in the 2009–10 season as champion of the third Division North.

References

External links
 
 

1981 births
Living people
Footballers from Dakar
Association football midfielders
Senegalese footballers
Senegalese expatriate footballers
Senegal international footballers
2002 African Cup of Nations players
2002 FIFA World Cup players
AS Saint-Étienne players
West Bromwich Albion F.C. players
Walsall F.C. players
ES Troyes AC players
Doxa Drama F.C. players
Ligue 1 players
Ligue 2 players
Senegalese expatriate sportspeople in France
Expatriate footballers in France
Senegalese expatriate sportspeople in England
Expatriate footballers in England
Senegalese expatriate sportspeople in Greece
Expatriate footballers in Greece